Distar Air is a Czech aircraft manufacturer based in Ústí nad Orlicí. The company specializes in the design and manufacture of light aircraft in the form of kits for amateur construction as well as ready-to-fly aircraft.

Distar Air was formed to continue the production of Urban Air designs, including the Distar Samba XXL touring aircraft and the Distar UFM-13 Lambada motorglider.

The company is owned by Společnost DISTAR CZ a.s., a diversified manufacturing concern that also produces machinery, engines and stone quarrying.

Distar Air has licensed production of the Samba to Airo Aviation in Dubai who produce the aircraft as the Airo 5.

Aircraft

References

External links

Aircraft manufacturers of the Czech Republic and Czechoslovakia
Ultralight aircraft
Homebuilt aircraft